Dumping may refer to:

Computing
Recording the contents of memory after application or operating system failure, or by operator request, in a core dump for use in subsequent problem analysis
Filesystem dump, strict data cloning used in backing up
Database dump or SQL dump, a record of the data from a database, usually in the form of a list of SQL statements

Economics
Dumping (pricing policy), in international trade, the pricing of a product below its cost of production
Social dumping, using transitory labour to save costs 
SUTA dumping, the avoidance of paying unemployment insurance taxes

Waste management
Environmental dumping, the shipping of waste to a country with lax environmental
Ocean dumping, the deliberate disposal of waste at sea
Illegal Dumping, the arized method of collecting waste

Aircraft technology
Fuel dumping, used to lighten the aircraft's weight and flammability in certain emergency situations

Mathematics
Equivalent dumping coefficient, used in the calculation of the energy dispersed when a building moves

Medicine
Gastric dumping syndrome, when intestines fill too quickly with undigested food from the stomach
Homeless dumping, medical workers releasing homeless patients on the streets
Emergency Medical Treatment and Active Labor Act, a 1986 act of the U.S. Congress to prevent "patient dumping" or the refusal to treat people because of inability to pay

Other uses
Breakup, in which one romantic partner may be said to be "dumping" the other
Defecation, the final act of digestion
Dumpin' (Psychopathic Rydas album), a 1999 album by hip-hop group Psychopathic Rydas
Dumping, deliberately playing poorly; see Glossary of contract bridge terms#D

See also
Dump (disambiguation)
Litter
Dumper (disambiguation)
Damper (disambiguation)
Damping (music)
Dumpling (cuisine)